

These are the National Registered Historic Places listings in Lowell, Massachusetts.

Current listings

|}

References

Buildings and structures in Lowell, Massachusetts
Lowell

Lowell, Massachusetts